Taumarunui High School is a high school in Taumarunui, New Zealand. There are approximately 300 students.

The school was originally located in the township.

The school's colours are navy blue and gold.

Notable alumni

 Prof. James L. Beck – Professor of Engineering and Applied Science, California Institute of Technology.
 Prof. John C. Butcher   – Honorary Research Professor, Dept. of Mathematics, University of Auckland.
 Ben Fouhy, world champion kayaker.
 Marc and Todd Hunter from the band Dragon.
 Ivan Mercep, 2008 recipient of the New Zealand Institute of Architects Gold Medal.
 Jenny Ludlam –  actress.

See also
List of schools in New Zealand

References

External links
Taumarunui High School Website

Boarding schools in New Zealand
Secondary schools in Manawatū-Whanganui